Klosterstern is a metro station on the Hamburg U-Bahn line U1. The station was opened in 1929 and is located in the Hamburg district of Harvestehude, Germany. Harvestehude is part of the Hamburg borough of Eimsbüttel.

Service

Trains 
Klosterstern is served by Hamburg U-Bahn line U1; departures are every 5 minutes.

Gallery

See also 

 List of Hamburg U-Bahn stations

References

External links 

 Line and route network plans at hvv.de 
 Pictures of Klosterstern U-Bahn station

Hamburg U-Bahn stations in Hamburg
U1 (Hamburg U-Bahn) stations
Buildings and structures in Eimsbüttel
Railway stations in Germany opened in 1929